Frank Stock, GBS (born 15 June 1945) is a Non-Permanent Judge of the Hong Kong Court of Final Appeal.  He was until 2014 a Vice President of the Hong Kong Court of Appeal.

Early life and education
Born in Southern Rhodesia (now Zimbabwe), Stock received his education in the United Kingdom. In 1967, he graduated from the University of Liverpool with a law degree.

Legal career
In 1968, Stock started his legal career as a barrister in England and Wales where he was in private practice for 10 years. He moved to Hong Kong in 1978 where he served in the Legal Department as a Crown Counsel. Within a year, he was promoted to Senior Crown Counsel, and by 1984, he was Principal Crown Counsel. Stock was called to the Hong Kong Bar in 1984 and took silk in 1985.

From 1987 to 1991 he was the Solicitor General. In 1991, he left the civil service.

Judicial career
In 1991, Stock sat as a Deputy High Court Judge.

In 1992, Stock was appointed as a full-time judge of the High Court of Justice of the Supreme Court (which became the Court of First Instance of the High Court on 1 July 1997). From 1993 to 1995, he was Chairman of the Insider Dealing Tribunal. He was Judge in charge of the Constitutional and Administrative Law List from 1999 to 2000.

Stock was elevated to the Court of Appeal in October 2000. He was appointed as Vice President of the Court of Appeal on 7 July 2009.

He was appointed a Non-Permanent Judge of the Court of Final Appeal in 2010. From 2010 to 2014, he primarily sat in the Court of Appeal and heard a few cases in the Court of Final Appeal.

He retired from the Court of Appeal as a full-time judge in 2014, but remains a Non-Permanent Judge of the Court of Final Appeal.

In 2014, Stock was awarded the Gold Bauhinia Star by the Chief Executive.

Quotes
"Those of us who live in societies where the common law is entrenched, where there is in fact an independent judiciary, and where basic courtesies and freedoms appear to be extended between man and man, take these things perhaps for granted. There is a need for us as judges and as practitioners and as students, as governmental authorities and as a community at large from time to time not to make assumptions but to stand back, go back to square one and to examine fundamentals; to understand the Ciceronian truism that we must all be slaves to the law in order to be free."

References

Hong Kong judges
Living people
1945 births
Alumni of the University of Liverpool
Zimbabwean emigrants to Hong Kong
Recipients of the Gold Bauhinia Star
British Hong Kong judges
Justices of the Court of Final Appeal (Hong Kong)
Solicitors General of Hong Kong